Buffalo Niagara International Airport  is in Cheektowaga, New York. The airport serves Buffalo, New York and Niagara Falls, New York United States, and the southern Golden Horseshoe region of Ontario, Canada. It is the third-busiest airport in the state of New York and the busiest inside of the Buffalo-Niagara Falls metropolitan area.

History

Buffalo Municipal Airport (as it was then known) opened in 1926 on former farmland, making it one of the country's oldest public airports. Passenger and mail service began in December 1927, with service to Cleveland. A WPA-built Art Deco v-shaped terminal with a large cylindrical tower began construction in 1938 and was completed in 1939. In 1940–41 Curtiss Aeroplane Co. built a manufacturing hangar on the southeast side of the airport (current Buffalo Airport Center property). With the onset of World War II, the airport was expanded to facilitate aircraft manufacturing, test and acceptance flight activity, and airline flights.

A new apron was added a few months later. Roadway and parkway improvements were made in the 1940s and 50s. Runways 1–19 and 8–26 were closed in the 1950s, and Runway 13–31 was renamed Runway 14–32.

The terminal's first expansion, to 11 gates, which tripled the terminal's square footage and added a restaurant, was built in 1955. In 1959, after being acquired by the Niagara Frontier Transportation Authority (NFTA), the name was changed to the Greater Buffalo International Airport. A 1961 renovation/expansion remodeled the main terminal building and built a new control tower and another concourse for American Airlines. A second terminal (the "West Terminal") was built in 1971 while it was hoped an all-new airport would be built in the near future. The West Terminal was built to last ten years and had nine gates.

Despite the addition of the West Terminal, the original terminal, the "East Terminal", received one more expansion in 1977. New ticket lobbies were built for American Airlines and United Airlines, the original 1938 building was turned into a baggage claim area and jetways were added for the first time. In 1982 two gates were added to the north/east end of the West Terminal, used by Eastern Air Lines. The landside of the West Terminal was also enlarged and the originally blue building was around that time repainted gray.

A large Curtiss-Wright plant once existed at the Airport. Built in 1942, the building was sold to Westinghouse in 1946 after the end of World War II. Westinghouse sold the facility to Buffalo developer Paul Snyder in 1985, who turned the building into the Buffalo Airport Center industrial park. The building was abandoned in 1991 and demolished in 1999 to allow Runway 14/32 to be lengthened. In 2006 the main runway was repaved and extended , its first major upgrade since 1980 and the secondary runway was extended .

In 2008 some local residents made a short-lived attempt to rename the airport to "Buffalo Tim Russert International Airport" after popular news commentator and a Buffalo native Tim Russert who had died that year.

Current terminal
In 1991 it was decided a new terminal would make more sense than continued renovations. Construction of the new building designed by the Greater Buffalo International Airport (GBIA) Design Group, a joint venture composed of Kohn Pederson Fox Associates, CannonDesign, and William Nicholas Bodouva began in 1995 in between the two existing buildings.

The new $56 million terminal (at newly named Buffalo-Niagara International Airport) opened on November 3, 1997 with 15 gates. The old terminals were demolished immediately to allow expansion. The new building was expanded in 2001, increasing the number of gates to 24.

Expansion
The expansion will create secure walkways on the east and west side of the terminal for arriving passengers and relocate the central exit walkway to eliminate bottlenecks with departing passengers on the second floor. This will also create expanded curbside space for arriving and departing passengers. The renovation will also replace the baggage claim area's three flat plate baggage carousels with four sloped plate carousels, doubling the current capacity. Preparations began December 2018, and groundbreaking and major construction began in February 2019. The renovations were completed in 2021. As part of the master plan, this expansion allows for the creation of a new pier south of the current east concourse.

Infrastructure

Runways
Buffalo Niagara International Airport is at elevation  and has two runways.

Emergency services
Buffalo Airport Fire Department responds to all fire and emergency medical aid calls in the terminal complex and adjacent property. The airport was formerly served by Buffalo Fire Department Engine 7 (crash-fire-rescue unit) until 1981 and was transferred to the Niagara Frontier Transportation Authority.  A new $11 million fire station was completed in 2017. The facility is off of Amherst Villa Road, triple the size of the old station and includes a training facility and other amenities.

Other facilities
Tac Air is the FBO for the airport. It provides private charter flights and other services, including fueling and ground handling, to many of the scheduled airlines that operate from the Buffalo-Niagara International Airport. It also provides aircraft maintenance service from its FAA approved repair station to airlines, corporate and general aviation customers. It is on the airport's north side. Prior to Tac Air taking over FBO operations in October 2020, Prior Aviation was the FBO.

Airspace
The airspace above Buffalo is prone to high flight traffic due to its proximity to Toronto Pearson International Airport, Billy Bishop Toronto City Airport and Hamilton International Airport. Most of these flights are inbound or outbound from destinations in the United States, Central America, the Caribbean and South America. Aircraft descending into the Toronto area use waypoints in Buffalo as part of their Standard Arrival Route (STARS) from the south. These aircraft are still well above  and do not affect the air traffic of Buffalo.

Service history

The April 1957 OAG shows 96 weekday departures: 55 American, 28 Capital, 10 Mohawk and 3 Allegheny. Nonstops didn't reach past Boston, New York, Pittsburgh and Chicago; Buffalo didn't get a nonstop beyond Chicago until Mohawk started Minneapolis in 1970. Continental tried Denver for a few months in 1987–88, American tried DFW a couple of times, and Northwest started Minneapolis in 1987—no others until Southwest started Phoenix and Las Vegas in October 2000.

When the federal government deregulated the airlines in 1978, Buffalo was served by four airlines: three "trunk carriers" (American Airlines, United Airlines, Eastern Air Lines) and one "local service carrier" (Allegheny Airlines). American and United used the East Terminal, and Allegheny and Eastern used the West Terminal.

During the "glory years" for mainline-sized jet service at U.S. medium-size airports in the 1970s and 1980s, Buffalo regularly hosted widebody passenger jets. American Airlines DC-10s flew to Chicago O'Hare International Airport and other points. Eastern Air Lines Lockheed L-1011s and Airbus A300s flew to Hartsfield–Jackson Atlanta International Airport. Eastern's flights often did 'tag-on' hops to Toronto Pearson International Airport due to legal restrictions on flights between the United States and Canada. Buffalo still hosts many mainline passenger jets, but scheduled flights are usually narrow-body (single-aisle) aircraft. Today, Buffalo hosts wide-body charter flights for the Buffalo Bills or their National Football League opponents.

Shortly after deregulation of the U.S. airline industry, American and United began reducing service at medium-sized Northeastern markets such as Buffalo. Many other airlines entered the Buffalo market and the 1980s saw a riot of new airline service as the industry began to take its post-deregulation shape. Most of these carriers did not survive the decade.

The most prominent new carrier at Buffalo was People Express Airlines, a low-fare carrier founded in 1981 with a hub at Newark International Airport. Buffalo, along with Norfolk, Virginia and Columbus, Ohio was one of the original three cities served by People from Newark. The airline grew rapidly into a major carrier and at its peak ran over 10 flights per day from Buffalo to Newark. Too-rapid growth including a purchase of the original Frontier Airlines led to People's demise in 1987. They were bought and assimilated by Continental Airlines.

Other carriers at Buffalo included:
 TWA (Trans World Airlines), which served Buffalo around 1979–1981 during a short-lived hub in Pittsburgh.
 Republic Airlines, a Minneapolis-based carrier that ran flights from Buffalo to its hub at Detroit starting in 1984 and that was bought by Northwest Airlines in 1987.
 Empire Airlines, a regional carrier based in Utica that built a hub at Syracuse Hancock International Airport after deregulation and ran regional jet and turboprop flights in the Northeast.
 Mall Airways, a small regional carrier based at Albany International Airport, operated flights from Buffalo to their Albany hub in the mid-1980s.
 Piedmont Airlines, a pre-deregulation local service carrier from North Carolina that built a hub at Baltimore–Washington International Airport after deregulation and ran flights to the Northeast, Southeast, and Florida, and was bought by USAir in 1987 and merged into them in 1989.
 Independence Air, a low-cost carrier serving primarily the East Coast, operated eight flights daily from Buffalo to their hub at Washington Dulles International Airport from July 2004 until it ceased operations in January 2006.

In 1986–1987 the US airline industry went through a series of buyouts and mergers, and by the end of 1989 most domestic air service in the US was provided by six "legacy carriers." At the end of the 1980s, airlines at Buffalo were mostly this six and their regional affiliates: American, United, Continental, USAir, Northwest and Delta Air Lines. During the 1990s, with People Express vanquished, these carriers kept fares high and enplanements stagnant at Buffalo.

Low fare service
At the beginning of the 21st century, Buffalo Niagara International Airport grew with the addition of low-cost carriers Southwest and JetBlue. Due to the "Southwest Effect", Buffalo Niagara International Airport exceeded the 5 million passenger mark in 2006. Previous estimates by the NFTA had projected 3.8 million passengers for 2006, and it would be 2020 before the 5 million passenger plateau would be reached. Buffalo is the largest airport by passenger traffic in Upstate New York and now averages 4.5–5.5 million passengers per year. Another addition to the low cost carriers was Frontier, which began service from Buffalo in 2017.

Canadian travelers
The proximity of Buffalo Niagara International Airport to the 9.2 million residents of the Golden Horseshoe region (which includes the metropolitan areas of Greater Toronto and Hamilton) in Ontario makes it a very popular airport for Canadians traveling to U.S. destinations. Despite the existence of three international airports in the region that provide cross-border flights (Toronto Pearson International Airport, Billy Bishop Toronto City Airport and John C. Munro Hamilton International Airport), one in three passengers utilizing Buffalo are from Canada and in 2012, 47 percent of all passengers were from Canada. This is due to air fares for US-bound Canadian flights being generally higher due to added customs and immigration surcharges, the value difference of Canadian and U.S. currency, and other taxes and fees. Several passenger shuttle services operate from the airport to cities in Southern Ontario, and to Toronto-Pearson and Hamilton airports.

Due to U.S. COVID-19 pandemic travel restrictions that require COVID-19 testing for international arrivals via air travel, Toronto-based professional sports teams have similarly used the airport as a travel hub, having their players transported by bus from Toronto since land crossings and domestic flights are not subject to testing.

Airlines and destinations
On average there are over 100 flights per day, with nonstop service to 30 airports across the United States and Puerto Rico.

Passenger

Cargo

Statistics

Total passengers

^Sharp decrease in traffic caused by the COVID-19 pandemic

Top destinations

Airline market share

Ground transportation

Car
The airport is served by the Kensington Expressway (NY Route 33), which ends at the airport.

Bus
Niagara Frontier Transportation Authority provides service on routes 24B (Genesee), 47 (Youngs Road), 68 (George Urban Express) and 204 (Airport-Downtown Express). NFTA Metro Paratransit offers services to the airport for people with mobility issues, but pre-booking is required.

Greyhound Bus Lines and Megabus also provide transportation to and from the airport, with services to Toronto and New York City, (dropping off at 34th and 11th avenues).

Car hire and taxi
Many national car hire firms all have rental facilities on airport property.  Alamo, Avis, Budget, Dollar, Enterprise, Hertz and National all are on-site.  Various limos, taxis and shuttle buses have access to and from the airport.

Accidents and incidents

 September 11, 1942 – Curtiss P-40 Warhawk crashes into the Curtiss-Wright Plant 2 building on the corner of Genesee Street and Sugg Road (Holtz Road) in Cheektowaga. The plane entered the roof of the building landing near the tool crib, trapping several employees. 14 deaths and 33 injuries were reported along with many acts of heroism among fellow employees. The plane was reported to have been at  when fire started to consume the cockpit. The pilot tried in vain to save the plane but was forced to parachute to safety, landing near Walden Avenue and Union Road. The plane plunged to earth, landing back near the airport. It is said that the impact was so great that the engine was planted into the cement floor of the factory. A marker can be found in the Long Term parking lot of Buffalo Niagara International Airport.
 January 21, 1954: American Airlines Flight 767, a Convair CV-240 crashed quickly after taking off from Buffalo Niagara International Airport. The left engine failed causing the pilot to attempt a return to the airport. No deaths and few injuries were reported.
 On August 2, 1958 – A Blue Angels jet flown by Lt. John R. Dewenter landed, wheels up at Buffalo Niagara International Airport after experiencing engine troubles during a show in Clarence. The Grumman F-11 Tiger landed on Runway 23 but exited airport property coming to rest in the intersection of Genesee Street and Dick Road, nearly hitting a gas station. Lt. Dewenter was uninjured and the plane was a total loss.
 On December 16, 1972, a private Cessna 421 crashed into the homes at 116 and 121 Diane Drive in Cheektowaga, New York near the airport. The crash killed three on board and three on the ground, at least 4 people on the ground were injured.
July 20, 1977 - A mail plane operated by Corporate Air and bound for Rochester crashed through the roof of the Westinghouse Electric Corp, plant in Cheektowaga killing the pilot and critically injuring a plant employee. The pilot of the plane, identified by officials as Eugene Snyder, was taken to St. Joseph Intercommunity Hospital in Cheektowaga, where he died shortly before 12:30 am.
February 18, 1998 – A twin engine Beechcraft chartered by Lt. Governor Betsy McCaughey Ross, a candidate for governor, carrying McCaughey Ross and three staff, crashed on take-off, with minor injuries. An FAA investigation determined that soggy conditions at the airport likely prevented the aircraft from catching fire.
 February 12, 2009 – Colgan Air Flight 3407, a Bombardier Dash 8 Q400 operating under contract with Continental Connection crashed into a home on Long Street in Clarence Center. All 49 passengers and crew members on board the aircraft perished in the incident, along with one individual on the ground. Two others who were in the home at the time of the accident escaped alive. Minutes before the accident, the crew had reported "significant ice buildup" on the wings and the windshield and an NTSB official said that the aircraft had experienced "severe pitch-and-roll excursions" 40 seconds prior to the crash. This was the first fatal accident of an airliner on US soil in almost 3 years after the crash of Comair Flight 5191. The crash was attributed to an aerodynamic stall caused by the crew's failure to monitor their airspeed.
 August 14, 2014 – N706GS, a 2013 Piper PA-28, crashed upon takeoff from runway 23. The short flight reached an altitude of 200–300 feet before landing on BNIA property and ending up in a premium parking lot southwest of The Terminal. The occupants: Bing Shen, 39, his six-year-old son and the pilot, a Certified Flight Instructor, Anastasiia Goldowsky, were treated and released from Erie County Medical Center. The flight was a plane for hire scheduled for an afternoon of sightseeing.
 April 22, 2015 – SkyWest Airlines Flight 5622, en route from O'Hare International Airport in Chicago to Bradley International Airport in Hartford made an emergency landing after one passenger reportedly lost consciousness.
 June 8, 2015 – Mesa Airlines Flight 3796, a Canadair Regional Jet CRJ-700, operated by United Express, skidded off of Runway 32 into a grass area, due to high winds. The plane departed from Dulles International Airport. There were no injuries.
 February 13, 2019 – United Airlines Flight 1442 to Newark Liberty International Airport struck a passenger jet bridge at Gate 9 while taxiing for takeoff. Strong winds and blowing snow were reported as the cause. There were no injuries among the 158 passengers on board.
 October 2, 2020—A Socata TBM-850 en route to Buffalo Niagara from Manchester-Boston crashed near Corfu, NY after suffering radio failures in the aircraft from Boston Center.

See also

 New York World War II Army Airfields

References

External links

 
 
 
 

 
 Buffalo Airport Hotel

Airports in New York (state)
Airports established in 1926
1926 establishments in New York (state)
Transportation buildings and structures in Buffalo, New York
Transportation buildings and structures in Erie County, New York
Historic American Engineering Record in New York (state)
Kohn Pedersen Fox buildings
Airfields of the United States Army Air Forces in New York (state)
Airfields of the United States Army Air Forces Technical Service Command